The Northern 1/4 Ton is a Canadian sailboat, that was designed by Cuthbertson & Cassian as an International Offshore Rule Quarter Ton class racer and first built in 1972.

The Northern 1/4 Ton design was developed into the Mirage 24 by Cuthbertson & Cassian in 1972.

Production
The boat was built by Northern Yachts in Ajax, Ontario, Canada, starting in 1972, but is now out of production.

Design
The Northern 1/4 Ton is a small recreational keelboat, built predominantly of fibreglass. It has a masthead sloop rig, a transom-hung rudder and a fixed fin keel. It displaces  and carries  of ballast.

See also
List of sailing boat types

Related development
Mirage 24

Similar sailboats
Achilles 24
Challenger 24
J/24
MacGregor 24
San Juan 24
Seidelmann 245
Shark 24

References

Keelboats
1970s sailboat type designs
Sailing yachts
Sailboat type designs by C&C Design
Sailboat types built by Northern Yachts